The Haunted is an American paranormal television series that premiered on November 22, 2009 on Animal Planet. Produced by Picture Shack Entertainment, the program features ghost stories and paranormal investigations involving animals. It also incorporates actual footage and photographs from the families and paranormal research teams involved.

The series is now repeating on Destination America.

Episodes

Season 1 (2009–2010)

Season 2 (2010)

Season 3 (2011)

See also
Ghost hunting
Haunted house
List of reportedly haunted locations
Paranormal television

References

External links
 by Animal Planet
 by Picture Shack Entertainment

Animal Planet original programming
Paranormal television
2009 American television series debuts
2011 American television series endings